Local elections were held in the Indian state of Telangana in 2020 for 3 municipal corporations and 3 municipalities.  Elections for Greater Hyderabad Municipal Corporation were held on 2 February 2016, Greater Warangal Municipal Corporation, Khammam Municipal Corporation and Achampet Municipality in March 2016, and Siddipet Municipality in April 2016.

Background 
In previous GHMC elections held in 2009, the Indian National Congress won 52 seats, followed by the Telugu Desam Party with 45 seats, and All India Majlis-e-Ittehadul Muslimeen won 43 seats. The Congress party and AIMIM formed the government together.

References 

Telengana
Local elections in Telangana